Väisälä is a tiny lunar impact crater located on a rise in the Oceanus Procellarum. Sharing the same continental island are the brilliant crater Aristarchus to the south-southeast and Herodotus to the south-southwest. Väisälä lies just to the west of the Rupes Toscanelli fault line, and the Rimae Aristarchus rille system. To the southwest is the notable Vallis Schröteri cleft.

This formation is circular and cup-shaped, with a higher albedo than the surrounding dark surface. It was previously designated Aristarchus A before being named after prolific Finnish astronomer Yrjö Väisälä by the IAU.

See also 
 1573 Väisälä , minor planet
 2804 Yrjö, minor planet

References 

 
 
 
 
 
 
 
 
 
 
 
 

Impact craters on the Moon